Loyal D. Rue (born June 7, 1944) is an American philosopher of religion. He is professor emeritus of religion and philosophy at Luther College of Decorah, Iowa. He focuses on naturalistic theories of religion and has been awarded two John Templeton Foundation fellowships. He has been for many years a member and lecturer at the Institute on Religion in an Age of Science (IRAS).

Views
Rue in his writings and teaching has been a proponent of religious naturalism and environmentalism: 

In Religion Is Not About God, Rue proposed that at the heart of almost all religions and cultures is a story – a myth. This is due to humans being emotional, narrative beings. Religions use what Rue called "ancillary strategies" to promote and make flourish their doctrines. He named five strategies: intellectual, experiential, ritual, aesthetic, and institutional (pages 128–142). To these may be added participants, practices, teachings, and social behavior.

In the Epilogue of Everybody's Story, Rue wrote:

Reception
Edward O. Wilson said of Rue's Religion Is Not About God: "This book is an important step towards the naturalistic, hence truly general theory of religion. It harmonizes contemporary scientific understanding of the origin of human nature with a positive view of the centrality of religious culture."

The individual perspectives on religious naturalism of Donald A. Crosby, Jerome A. Stone, Ursula Goodenough and Rue are discussed by Michael Hogue in his 2010 book The Promise of Religious Naturalism.

Major publications
 Nature is Enough: Religious Naturalism and the Meaning of Life, State University of New York Press, 2012, 
Religion Is Not About God: How Spiritual Traditions Nurture Our Biological Nature And What to Expect When They Fail, Rutgers University Press, 2006, 
Everybody's Story: Wising Up to the Epic of Evolution, State University of New York Press, 1999, 
By the Grace of Guile: The Role of Deception in Natural History and Human Affairs, Oxford University Press, 1994,  (A New York Times Notable Book)
Amythia: Crisis in the Natural History of Western Culture, University Alabama Press, 1989, 

Rue also served as co-editor of the volume Contemporary Classics in Philosophy of Religion, Open Court Pub. Co., 1991,

References

Further reading
 2010 Michael Hogue The Promise of Religious Naturalism,  Rowman & Littlefield, 
 2008 Michael Dowd Thank God for Evolution, Viking, 
 2008 Jerome A. Stone Religious Naturalism Today: The Rebirth of a Forgotten Alternative, State University of New York Press
 2006 John Haught Is Nature Enough?, Cambridge University Press, 
 2000 Ursula Goodenough Sacred Depths of Nature, Oxford University Press

Luther College (Iowa) faculty
Religious naturalists
1944 births
Living people